Montlouis is a commune in the Cher department in the Centre-Val de Loire region of France. The printer-bookseller Martin Silvestre Boulard (1748–1809) was born in this village.

Geography 
The small river Auzon flows through the north of the commune.

Population

Sights 
 The church of St. Martin, dating from the twelfth century (Historic monument).
 The medieval Maison de Varennes.

See also 
Communes of the Cher department

References 

Communes of Cher (department)